Andrei Stroenco (born 1 December 1971) is a retired Moldovan football midfielder.

References

External links
 

1971 births
Living people
Moldovan footballers
CS Tiligul-Tiras Tiraspol players
SC Odesa players
FC Kryvbas Kryvyi Rih players
FC Nistru Otaci players
FC Atyrau players
Association football midfielders
Moldovan expatriate footballers
Expatriate footballers in Ukraine
Moldovan expatriate sportspeople in Ukraine
Expatriate footballers in Kazakhstan
Moldovan expatriate sportspeople in Kazakhstan
Expatriate footballers in Russia
Moldovan expatriate sportspeople in Russia
Moldova international footballers
FC Chornomorets Odesa players
FC Kryvbas-2 Kryvyi Rih players
FC Chita players